Barkeria spectabilis is a species of orchid. It is native to El Salvador, Chiapas, Guatemala, Honduras, and Nicaragua.

Barkeria spectabilis is an epiphyte growing on Quercus trees  at elevations of around 4,900 feet (1,500 m). It is closely related to Epidendrum.  Flowers are white to pink with darker speckles, blooming from April to August.

References

spectabilis
Orchids of Mexico
Orchids of Central America
Plants described in 1842